In a Latin Bag is an album by American jazz vibraphonist Cal Tjader featuring performances recorded in 1961 and released on the Verve label.

Reception

AllMusic awarded the album 3 stars stating "Cal Tjader recorded prolifically for Verve during the first half of the 1960s, though this is one of his lesser-known dates ... it is well worth snapping up if found".

Track listing
All compositions by Cal Tjader except where noted.
 "Ben-Hur" (Miklós Rózsa) – 2:25
 "Green Dolphin Street" (Bronisław Kaper, Ned Washington) – 5:30
 "Pauneto´s Point" – 3:04
 "Speak Low" (Kurt Weill, Ogden Nash) – 2:57
 "Triste"  – 4:01
 "Misty" (Erroll Garner) – 2:48
 "Mambo in Miami" (Armando Peraza) – 2:40
 "Ecstasy" (Paul Horn) – 2:30
 "Half and Half" (Horn) – 4:01

Personnel
Cal Tjader – vibraphone, piano
Paul Horn – flute, alto saxophone
Lonnie Hewitt – piano
Al McKibbon – bass
Johnny Rae – drums
Wilfredo Vicente – congas
Armando Peraza – bongos
Technical
Pete Turner - photography

References

Cal Tjader albums
1961 albums
Albums produced by Creed Taylor
Verve Records albums